Perminder Mann is the CEO of Bonnier Books UK, the seventh largest publisher in the UK with sales of over £80m. Mann is recognised as one of the UK's most powerful leaders and as a publishing innovator – one of the first to publish a social media influencer and for her work introducing inclusive workplace policy.

Mann holds the position of Chair of the Publisher's Association Consumer Publishing Council, is a fellow of the Royal Society of Arts, a member of the advisory board for Kingston University's publishing program, and of the BBC100 steering group committee. She also appears annually in the UK's top 100 most influential people in book publishing, a list compiled by the industry's trade magazine, the Bookseller, and in 2015 was named as one of the top 10 most influential people in publishing and writing, at the prestigious Hospital Club h100 awards.

Perminder Mann was the first CEO of a major publisher to announce the move to a full flexible working policy in 2020. Perminder is an advocate for inclusivity and collaboration in the workplace.

Career
After studying at De Montfort University, Mann began her career in publishing working for trade publishers Macmillan and Transworld, before moving on to work with two international independent publishers, Hinkler and Phidal Publishing. She then spent time in the toy industry, before returning to publishing to work for Bonnier Publishing, which rebranded as Bonnier Books UK in 2018.

During her time at Bonnier Books UK, she co-founded adult non-fiction imprint Blink Publishing. In 2014, the imprint became the first UK publisher to collaborate with a vlogger when it signed Alfie Deyes. Under Mann, Blink published The Pointless Book, which was a 2014 bestseller.

In 2015 and 2016, Mann was named on The Booksellers list of the 100 most influential people in publishing. She was also on the awards list of the top 10 most influential people in publishing and writing by the Hospital Club h100.

In 2017, Mann was promoted to CEO of Bonnier Books UK, heading the UK group. In the same year, she secured the deal for Bonnier Books UK to partner with Disney on a range of titles. She was subsequently recognised as one of the most powerful BAME leaders in the UK She was the only person from the book publishing industry to appear on the list.

In 2020, Mann was appointed to Chair of the Publisher's Association Consumer Publishing Council. In the same year, Bonnier Books UK was awarded the London Book Fair International Excellence Award for Inclusivity in Publishing. Mann was the first CEO of a major UK publisher to announce the move to a full flexible working policy for all office staff.

References

Further reading
 

British publishers (people)
British chief executives
Women in publishing
Living people
Year of birth missing (living people)